The Kolowrat Palace is a Baroque complex of two Gothic buildings, located at Ovocný trh 4 a 6 in the Old Town part of the Prague 1 district in Prague, Czech Republic. 

The palace belongs to the Kolowrat family. The family bought the first building in 1670 and the second one in 1697. The original vaults from the early Baroque period are located on the ground floor, and the rooms on the first floor are decorated with Baroque painted-wood ceilings. 

Around 1948, the palace was nationalized by the government, but after the Velvet Revolution in 1989, the property was returned to the family. In 1993, Count Jindrich Kolowrat-Krakowsky (1897–1996) rented out the palace to the National Theatre for a symbolic annual amount of one Czech koruna.

References

External links

Palaces in Prague